A petasos or petasus is a broad brimmed hat of Thessalian origin worn by ancient Greeks, Thracians and Etruscans, often in combination with the chlamys cape. It was made of wool felt, leather, straw or animal skin. Women's versions had a high crown while those for men featured a lower crown. It was worn primarily by farmers, travellers and hunters, and was considered characteristic of rural people. Elite Greek men generally chose not to wear hats. As a winged hat, it became the symbol of Hermes, the Greek mythological messenger god.

Along with the pileus, the petasos was the most common hat worn in Greece between 1200 and 146 B.C.E. Its wide brim protected the wearer from the sun and rain while a lengthy strap allowed wearers to secure it under the chin. When not needed, the hat was often worn hanging behind the head. Its popularity later extended to the Etruscans, the Byzantine Empire and the Roman Empire, in slightly modified forms.

A type of metal helmet worn by Athenian cavalry was made in the shape of a petasos. Some examples have holes around the outer edge of the brim, presumably so a fabric cover could be attached. These are known from reliefs and vase paintings, with at least one archaeological example found in an Athenian tomb.

Gallery

See also
Clothing in ancient Greece
Kausia
Winged helmet

References

Hats
Hermes
Greek clothing
Culture of ancient Thessaly
Mythological clothing